HR 2096, also known as HD 40325 is a double star in the constellation Auriga. It is composed of two ageing orange giants of spectral types K0III and K2III. It is not a member of any known moving group of stars.

References

Components

Auriga (constellation)
040325
Double stars
028438
K-type giants
2096
Durchmusterung objects